Ephel Duath may refer to:

 Ephel Dúath, mountain range in Middle-earth
 Ephel Duath (band), Italian band